Emperor Taizong of Tang (28January 59810July 649), previously Prince of Qin, personal name Li Shimin, was the second emperor of the Tang dynasty of China, ruling from 626 to 649. He is traditionally regarded as a co-founder of the dynasty for his role in encouraging Li Yuan, his father, to rebel against the Sui dynasty at Jinyang in 617. Taizong subsequently played a pivotal role in defeating several of the dynasty's most dangerous opponents and solidifying its rule over China.

Taizong is considered to be one of the greatest emperors in China's history and henceforth, his reign became regarded as the exemplary model against which all future emperors were measured. His era, the "Reign of Zhenguan" is considered a golden age in ancient Chinese history and was treated as required studying material for future crown princes. Taizong continued to develop imperial examination systems. He asked his officers to become loyal to the policies not people, in order to eliminate corruption. Under the Zhenguan era, Tang China flourished economically and militarily. For more than a century after his death, China enjoyed prosperity and peace brought about by the solidification of imperial protection over the Chinese regions. In territorial extent, it covered most of the territories previously held by the Han dynasty and parts of modern Korea, Vietnam, Russia, Mongolia, Xinjiang, and Central Asian regions. This era of consolidation and conquest laid the foundation for Xuanzong's reign, which is considered to be the height of the Tang dynasty.

In 630, Emperor Taizong sent his general Li Jing against the Eastern Turks, defeating and capturing their Jiali Khan Ashina Duobi and destroying their power. This made Tang the dominant power in East and Central Asia, and Emperor Taizong subsequently took the title of Tengeri Qaghan ("Tenger Khan" or the God like Emperor). He also launched a series of campaigns against the oasis states of the Tarim Basin, and against the armies of their main ally, the Western Turks. During his reign, Tang armies annexed Karakhoja in 640, Karasahr in 644 and Kucha in 648. Eventually, the Tang defeated and annexed the Western Gokturk khaganate after Su Dingfang defeated Qaghan Ashina Helu in 657.

Unlike much of the nobility in his time, Emperor Taizong was a frank rationalist and scholar of logic and scientific reason, openly scorning superstitions and claims of signs from the heavens. He also modified important rites in order to ease the burden of agricultural labour. The modern Chinese historian Bo Yang opined that Emperor Taizong achieved greatness by enduring criticism which others would find difficult to accept whilst trying hard not to abuse his absolute power (using Emperor Yang of Sui as a negative example), as well as through his employment of capable chancellors such as Fang Xuanling, Du Ruhui and Wei Zheng. Emperor Taizong's wife Empress Zhangsun also proved to be a capable assistant.

Early life
Lǐ Shìmín was born in 598 at Wugong, in modern Xianyang, Shaanxi). His father Li Yuan, the Duke of Tang, was a general of the Sui Dynasty, and a nephew, by marriage, to Sui's founding emperor Emperor Wen. Li Shimin's grandmother Duchess Dugu was a sister of Empress Dugu, both of whom were daughters of Dugu Xin, a major Xianbei general during Sui's predecessor dynasty Northern Zhou. Li Shimin's mother, Li Yuan's wife Duchess Dou, was a daughter of Dou Yi, the Duke of Shenwu, and his wife, Northern Zhou's Princess Xiangyang. Duchess Dou bore Li Yuan four sons—an older brother to Li Shimin, Li Jiancheng, and two younger brothers, Li Yuanba, who would die in 614, and Li Yuanji – and at least one daughter (the later Princess Pingyang). Li Yuan named Li Shimin "Shimin" as a shortened form of the phrase "save the earth and pacify the people". Li Shimin apparently showed talent early in his life, and in 613, the official Gao Shilian, impressed with him, gave him a niece (the later Empress Zhangsun) in marriage as his wife; he was 14 and she was 12. In 615, when Emperor Wen's son and successor Emperor Yang was ambushed by Eastern Turkic (Dongtujue) forces under Shibi Khan at Yanmen Commandery (present-day Daixian in Shanxi), a general call was made for men to join the army to help rescue the emperor. Li Shimin answered that call and served under the general Yun Dingxing, apparently doing so with distinction. In 616, when Li Yuan was put in charge of the important city of Taiyuan, he brought Li Shimin with him to Taiyuan, while leaving at least three other sons—Li Jiancheng, Li Yuanji, and Li Zhiyun (by Li Yuan's concubine Lady Wan)—at the ancestral home Hedong (in modern Yuncheng, Shanxi).

Participation in the rebellion against Sui rule

Emperor Yang was soon dissatisfied with Li Yuan and Wang Rengong, the governor of Mayi Commandery (roughly modern Shuozhou, Shanxi), over their inability to stop Eastern Turkic incursions and the growing strength of agrarian rebels, particularly the Eastern Turkic-supported Liu Wuzhou, who soon rose against Wang, killed him, and captured Emperor Yang's secondary palace near Taiyuan. Li Yuan also became fearful of a prophecy that the next emperor would be named Li — Emperor Yang had previously killed another official, Li Hun, and Li Hun's clan over his fear that Li Hun's nephew, Li Min, would seize the throne.

Fearful for his life, Li Yuan considered rebellion. However, he did not know that Li Shimin had also been secretly discussing plans for rebellion with Li Yuan's associates Pei Ji and Liu Wenjing. Once Li Shimin's plans matured, he had Pei inform Li Yuan of them—and also had Pei warn Li Yuan that if it were revealed that Li Yuan had had sexual relations with some of Emperor Yang's ladies in waiting at the secondary Jinyang Palace (which Pei was in charge with and had allowed Li Yuan to do so), all of them would be slaughtered. Li Yuan agreed to rebel, and after secretly summoning Li Jiancheng and Li Yuanji from Hedong and his son-in-law Chai Shao from the capital Chang'an, he declared a rebellion, claiming to want to support Emperor Yang's grandson Yang You the Prince of Dai, nominally in charge at Chang'an with Emperor Yang at Jiangdu (in modern Yangzhou, Jiangsu), as emperor. He made both Li Jiancheng and Li Shimin major generals and advanced southwest, toward Chang'an. He gave Li Shimin the title of Duke of Dunhuang. After defeating local Sui forces loyal to Emperor Yang, he defeated a Sui army of 30,000 men under the command of a veteran general of the wars in Korea outside of modern-day Beijing.

However, when Li Yuan arrived near Hedong, his army was bogged down by the weather. With food running out, there were rumors that the Eastern Turks and Liu Wuzhou would attack Taiyuan. Li Yuan initially ordered retreat, but at the earnest opposition by Li Jiancheng and Li Shimin, continued to advance. After defeating Sui forces at Huoyi (also in modern Yuncheng), he decided to leave a small contingent to watch over Hedong while advancing across the Yellow River into Guanzhong (i.e., the Chang'an region). Once he did, he headed for Chang'an himself, while sending Li Jiancheng to capture the territory around the Tong Pass region to prevent Sui forces at Luoyang from reinforcing Chang'an and Li Shimin north of the Wei River to capture territory there. Meanwhile, Li Shimin's sister (Chai's wife) had also risen in rebellion in support of him, and she was able to gather a sizeable army and capture some cities. She joined forces with Li Shimin and her husband Chai Shao. Soon, Li Yuan reconsolidated his forces and put Chang'an under siege. In winter 617, after defeating a large Sui army, he captured Chang'an from imperial forces and declared Yang You emperor (as Emperor Gong). He had himself made regent (with the title of grand chancellor) and created the Prince of Tang. (Meanwhile, most of the Sui territories and armies did not recognize Emperor Gong as emperor and continued to recognize Emperor Yang as emperor and not as retired emperor.) He made Li Shimin the Duke of Qin.

Li Yuan's control of the Chang'an region became almost immediately contested by the rebel ruler Xue Ju, the Emperor of Qin, who sent his son Xue Rengao toward Chang'an. Li Yuan sent Li Shimin to resist Xue Rengao, and Li Shimin defeated Xue Rengao at Fufeng, in modern Baoji, Shaanxi), temporarily causing Xue Ju to toy with the idea of surrendering to Li Yuan, although Xue was subsequently dissuaded by his strategist Hao Yuan from doing so.

In spring 618, with Sui's eastern capital Luoyang (where the officials in charge did not recognize Li Yuan's authorities) under attack by the rebel ruler Li Mi the Duke of Wei, Li Yuan sent Li Jiancheng and Li Shimin to Luoyang, ostensibly to aid the Sui forces at Luoyang but instead intending to test whether Luoyang might submit to him. The officials at Luoyang rebuffed his attempt at rapprochement, and Li Jiancheng and Li Shimin, not wanting to fight either them or Li Mi for control of Luoyang at this stage, withdrew. Li Yuan subsequently changed Li Shimin's title to Duke of Zhao.

In summer 618, when news arrived at Chang'an that Emperor Yang had been killed at Jiangdu in a coup led by the general Yuwen Huaji, Li Yuan had Emperor Gong yield the throne to him, establishing Tang Dynasty as its Emperor Gaozu. He created Li Jiancheng crown prince but created Li Shimin the Prince of Qin, also making him Shangshu Ling, the head of the executive bureau of the government and a post considered one for a chancellor, while continuing to have Li Shimin serve as a major general as well.

During Emperor Gaozu's reign

Campaign to reunify the empire
The first thing that Li Shimin had to deal with was another incursion by Xue Ju, as Xue attacked Jing Prefecture (roughly modern Pingliang, Gansu) and Emperor Gaozu sent Li Shimin to resist Xue. Li Shimin established his defenses and refused to engage Xue to try to wear Xue Ju out, but at that time, he was afflicted with malaria, and he let his assistants Liu Wenjing and Yin Kaishan take command, ordering them not to engage Xue Ju. Liu and Yin, however, did not take Xue Ju seriously, and Xue Ju ambushed them at Qianshui Plain (in modern Xianyang), crushing Tang forces and inflicting 50%–60% casualties. Li Shimin was forced to withdraw back to Chang'an, and Liu and Yin were removed from their posts. (This would be Li Shimin's only defeat recorded in historical records until the Goguryeo campaign of 645.) Xue Ju, in light of his victory, was ready to launch an assault on Chang'an itself, under Hao Yuan's advice, but suddenly died of an illness in fall 618 and was succeeded by Xue Rengao. Emperor Gaozu then sent Li Shimin against Xue Rengao. Three months after Xue Rengao took the throne, Li Shimin engaged him, and after a fierce battle between Li Shimin and Xue Rengao's major general Zong Luohou, Li Shimin crushed Zong's forces, and then attacked Xue Rengao. Xue Rengao was forced to withdraw into the city of Gaozhi (in modern Xianyang as well), and once he did, his soldiers began surrendering to Li Shimin en masse. Xue Rengao was himself forced to surrender. Li Shimin had him delivered to Chang'an, where he was executed. Around new year 619, Emperor Gaozu made Li Shimin Taiwei (one of the Three Excellencies) and put him in charge of Tang operations east of the Tong Pass. 

In spring 619, Liu Wuzhou launched a major offensive against Tang. He captured Taiyuan in summer 619, forcing Li Yuanji, who had been in charge there, to flee, and then continued his offensive south. Emperor Gaozu sent Pei Ji against him, but by winter 619, Liu had crushed Pei's forces and taken over nearly all of modern Shanxi. Emperor Gaozu, shocked at the development, considered abandoning the region altogether. Li Shimin opposed doing so and offered to lead the army against Liu. Emperor Gaozu agreed and commissioned him with an army. He crossed the Yellow River and approached Liu's major general Song Jingang but did not engage him, choosing to try to wear Song out, only having his subordinates Yin Kaishan and Qin Shubao engage the other Dingyang generals Yuchi Jingde and Xun Xiang in relatively low-level engagements. Eventually, in spring 620, when Liu and Song ran out of food supplies, they retreated, and Li Shimin gave chase, dealing Song a major defeat. Yuchi and Xun surrendered, and after Li Shimin chased further, both Liu and Song fled to the Eastern Turks. All of Dingyang territory fell into Tang hands.

In summer 620, Emperor Gaozu again commissioned Li Shimin against a major enemy—the former Sui general Wang Shichong, who had Sui's last emperor, Emperor Yang's grandson Yang Tong, yield the throne to him in 619, establishing a new state of Zheng as its emperor. When Li Shimin arrived at the Zheng capital Luoyang, Wang offered peace, but Li Shimin rebuffed him and put Luoyang under siege. Meanwhile, his subordinates took Zheng cities one by one. By winter 620, most of Zheng territory, other than Luoyang and Xiangyang, defended by Wang Shichong's nephew Wang Honglie, had submitted to Tang. Wang sought aid Dou Jiande the Prince of Xia, who controlled most of modern Hebei. Dou, reasoning that if Tang were able to destroy Zheng, his own Xia state would be next, agreed. He sent his official Li Dashi to try to persuade Li Shimin to withdraw, but Li Shimin detained Li Dashi and gave no response. Meanwhile, during the campaign, Li Shimin chose some 1,000 elite soldiers, clad in black uniform and black armor, commanded by himself, to serve as advance troops, with Qin Shubao, Yuchi Jingde, Cheng Zhijie, and Zhai Zhangsun as his assistants.

By spring 621, Luoyang was in desperate situation, and Xia forces had not yet arrived, but Tang troops had also suffered serious casualties, as Luoyang's defenses, aided by powerful bows and catapults, were holding. Emperor Gaozu, hearing that Dou had decided to come to Wang's aid, ordered Li Shimin to withdraw, but Li Shimin sent his secretary Feng Deyi to Chang'an to explain to Emperor Gaozu that if he did withdraw, Wang would recover and again be a major threat in the future. Emperor Gaozu agreed and allowed Li Shimin to continue to siege Luoyang. When Xia forward troops arrived first, Li Shimin surprised and defeated them, and then sent Dou a letter suggesting that he withdraw. Dou would not do so, and, against the advice of his wife Empress Cao and secretary general Ling Jing that he should instead attack Tang's prefectures in modern southern Shanxi, he marched toward Luoyang. Anticipating Dou's maneuver, Li Shimin left a small detachment, commanded by Li Yuanji, at Luoyang, while marching east himself, taking up position at the strategic Hulao Pass. When the armies engaged at Hulao, Li Shimin defeated Dou and captured him. He took Dou back to Luoyang and displayed him to Wang Shichong. Wang, in fear, considered abandoning Luoyang and fleeing south to Xiangyang, but as his generals pointed out that his only hope was Dou, he surrendered. Xia forces, after initially fleeing back to their capital Mingzhou (now Guangfu, Hebei), also surrendered. Zheng and Xia territory were Tang's. Li Shimin returned to Chang'an in a grand victory procession and, to reward Li Shimin, Emperor Gaozu awarded both him and Li Yuanji three mints so that they could mint money of their own. He also bestowed on Li Shimin the special title of "Grand General of Heavenly Strategies". Meanwhile, Li Shimin's staff, already full of generals and strategists, were supplemented with a number of literary men.

The former Xia territory did not remain in Tang hands for long. In the winter of 621, the Xia general Liu Heita rose against Tang rule, claiming to be avenging Dou, whom Emperor Gaozu had executed against Li Shimin's wishes after he had been brought back to Chang'an. Liu was allied with Xu Yuanlang, a former agrarian rebel general who was nominally under Wang Shichong and who had submitted to Tang after Wang's defeat. Liu dealt successive defeats to Emperor Gaozu's cousin Li Shentong, the Prince of Huai'an; Li Xiaochang, the Prince of Yi'an; and Li Shiji. By the end, he had recovered almost all of the former Xia territory, established his capital at Mingzhou, and proclaimed himself the Prince of Handong. Emperor Gaozu finally sent Li Shimin and Li Yuanji against him in 622 and, after some indecisive battles, Li Shimin defeated him by first erecting a dam across the Ming River and then destroying it, with the resultant flood destroying the rebel army. Liu fled to the Eastern Turks, while Li Shimin then headed east and defeated Xu. After leaving Li Shiji, Li Shentong, and Ren Gui to continue attacking Xu, Li Shimin returned to Chang'an.

Struggle against Li Jiancheng and Li Yuanji

By this point, Li Shimin and his older brother Li Jiancheng, who was created crown prince in 618, reportedly after Emperor Gaozu first offered the position to Li Shimin due to his contributions, were locked in an intense rivalry, as Li Shimin's accomplishments caused people to speculate that he would displace Li Jiancheng as crown prince, and Li Jiancheng, while an accomplished general himself, was overshadowed by his younger brother. The court became divided into a faction favoring the Crown Prince and a faction favoring the Prince of Qin. The rivalry was particularly causing problems within the capital, as the commands of the Crown Prince, the Prince of Qin, and the Prince of Qi (i.e., Li Yuanji) were said to have the same force as the emperor's edicts, and the officials had to carry conflicting orders out by acting on the ones that arrived first. Li Shimin's staff was full of talented men, but Li Jiancheng was supported by Li Yuanji, as well as Emperor Gaozu's concubines, who had better relationships with Li Jiancheng and Li Yuanji than they did with Li Shimin.

Late in 622, when Liu Heita returned east after receiving aid from the Eastern Turks, defeating and killing Li Shimin's cousin Li Daoxuan, the Prince of Huaiyang, he again regained most of former Xia territory. Li Jiancheng's staff members Wang Gui and Wei Zheng suggested that Li Jiancheng needed to enhance his own reputation in battle, and so Li Jiancheng volunteered for the mission. Emperor Gaozu thus sent Li Jiancheng, assisted by Li Yuanji, to attack Liu.  Li Jiancheng defeated Liu around the new year of 623, and Liu was subsequently betrayed by his own official Zhuge Dewei and delivered to Li Jiancheng.  Li Jiancheng executed Liu in his former capital and returned to Chang'an in triumph. China was, by this point, roughly united under Tang rule.

For the next few years, the rivalry intensified, although during the meantime both Li Jiancheng and Li Shimin served as generals when the Eastern Göktürks made incursions.  In 623, when the general Fu Gongshi rebelled at Danyang (in modern Nanjing, Jiangsu), Emperor Gaozu briefly commissioned Li Shimin to attack Fu, but soon cancelled the order and sent Li Shimin's cousin Li Xiaogong the Prince of Zhao Commandery instead.

In 624, when Li Jiancheng was found to have, against regulations, tried to add soldiers to his guard corps, Emperor Gaozu was so angry that he put Li Jiancheng under arrest.  In fear, Li Jiancheng's guard commander Yang Wen'gan rebelled. Emperor Gaozu sent Li Shimin against Yang, offering to make him crown prince after he returned.  After Li Shimin left, however, Feng Deyi (now a chancellor), Li Yuanji, and the concubines all spoke on Li Jiancheng's behalf, and after Li Shimin returned, Emperor Gaozu did not depose Li Jiancheng, but instead blamed the discord between him and Li Shimin on Li Jiancheng's staff members Wang Gui and Wei Ting and Li Shimin's staff member Du Yan, exiling them to Xi Prefecture (roughly modern Liangshan Yi Autonomous Prefecture, Sichuan).

Later that year, Emperor Gaozu, troubled by repeated Göktürk incursions, seriously considered burning Chang'an to the ground and moving the capital to Fancheng, a suggestion that Li Jiancheng, Li Yuanji, and Pei Ji agreed with.  Li Shimin opposed, however, and the plan was not carried out.  Meanwhile, Li Shimin himself was sending his confidants to Luoyang to build up personal control of the army there.  After an incident in which Li Shimin suffered a severe case of food poisoning after feasting at Li Jiancheng's palace—an event that both Emperor Gaozu and Li Shimin apparently interpreted as an assassination attempt—Emperor Gaozu considered sending Li Shimin to guard Luoyang to prevent further conflict, but Li Jiancheng and Li Yuanji, after consulting each other, believed that this would only give Li Shimin an opportunity to build up his personal power there, and therefore opposed it.  Emperor Gaozu therefore did not carry out the plan.  Meanwhile, the rivalry continued.  Traditional historical accounts also indicated that at one point, when Li Shimin visited Li Yuanji's mansion, Li Yuanji wanted to assassinate Li Shimin, but Li Jiancheng, who could not resolve to kill a brother, stopped the plot.  There was yet another incident in which Li Jiancheng, knowing that a horse threw its rider easily, had Li Shimin ride it, causing Li Shimin to fall off from it several times.

By 626, Li Shimin was fearful that he would be killed by Li Jiancheng, and his staff members Fang Xuanling, Du Ruhui, and Zhangsun Wuji were repeatedly encouraging Li Shimin to attack Li Jiancheng and Li Yuanji first—while Wei Zheng was encouraging Li Jiancheng to attack Li Shimin first. Li Jiancheng persuaded Emperor Gaozu to remove Fang and Du, as well as Li Shimin's trusted guard generals Yuchi Jingde and Cheng Zhijie, from Li Shimin's staff. Zhangsun Wuji, who remained on Li Shimin's staff, continued to try to persuade Li Shimin to attack first.

In summer 626, the Göktürks were making another attack, and under Li Jiancheng's suggestion, Emperor Gaozu, instead of sending Li Shimin to resist the Göktürks as he first was inclined, decided to send Li Yuanji instead.  Li Yuanji was given command of much of the army previously under Li Shimin's control, further troubling Li Shimin, who believed that with the army in Li Yuanji's hands, he would be unable to resist an attack.  Li Shimin had Yuchi summon Fang and Du back to his mansion secretly, and then on one night submitted an accusation to Emperor Gaozu that Li Jiancheng and Li Yuanji were committing adultery with Emperor Gaozu's concubines.  Emperor Gaozu, in response, issued summonses to Li Jiancheng and Li Yuanji for the next morning, convening the senior officials Pei Ji, Xiao Yu, and Chen Shuda to examine Li Shimin's accusations.  As Li Jiancheng and Li Yuanji approached the central gate leading to Emperor Gaozu's palace, Xuanwu Gate, Li Shimin carried out the ambush he had set.  He personally fired an arrow that killed Li Jiancheng.  Subsequently, Yuchi Jingde killed Li Yuanji.  Li Shimin's forces entered the palace and, under the intimidation of Li Shimin's forces, Emperor Gaozu agreed to create Li Shimin crown prince.  Li Jiancheng's and Li Yuanji's sons were killed, and Li Shimin took Li Yuanji's wife Princess Yang as a concubine.  Two months later, with Li Shimin firmly in control of power, Emperor Gaozu yielded the throne to him (as Emperor Taizong).

As emperor

Early reign (626–633) 

One of the first actions that Emperor Taizong carried out as emperor was releasing a number of ladies in waiting from the palace and returning them to their homes, so that they could be married.  He made his wife Princess Zhangsun the empress, and their oldest son Li Chengqian the crown prince.

Emperor Taizong also immediately faced a crisis, as the Eastern Turkic leader Jiali Khan Ashina Duobi, along with his nephew the subordinate Tuli Khan Ashina Shibobi, launched a major incursion toward Chang'an, and just 19 days after Emperor Taizong took the throne, the two khans were just across the Wei River from Chang'an.  Emperor Taizong, accompanied by Gao Shilian and Fang Xuanling, was forced to meet Ashina Duobi across the river and personally negotiate peace terms, including tributes to Eastern Turks, before Ashina Duobi withdrew.

Late in 626, Emperor Taizong ranked the contributors to Tang rule and granted them titles and fiefs, naming among the first rank of contributors Zhangsun Wuji, Fang Xuanling, Du Ruhui, Yuchi Jingde, and Hou Junji.  When Li Shentong, as his distant uncle, objected to being ranked under Fang and Du, Emperor Taizong personally explained how Fang and Du's strategies allowed him to be successful, and this managed to get the other objectors to quiet down, as Emperor Taizong was even willing to rank low such an honored individual as Li Shentong.  Emperor Taizong also buried Li Jiancheng and Li Yuanji with honors due imperial princes and had their staff members attend the funeral processions.  Meanwhile, he appeared to begin to reshuffle government further—which he had already begun after being created crown prince—by dismissing his father's trusted advisors Xiao Yu and Chen Shuda, making his own trusted advisors chancellors. (Xiao, however, was soon restored to being chancellor, although his career during Emperor Taizong's reign would see repeated dismissals and repeated restorations.) However, he also began to greatly pay attention to the officials' submissions and their criticism of imperial governance, making changes where he saw needed.  He also particularly began to trust Wei Zheng, accepting much advice from Wei as far as his personal conduct was concerned. He was also willing to demote his own trusted advisors, as he demoted Gao Shilian after finding that Gao had held back submissions from his deputy Wang Gui. Viewing Sui's Emperor Yang as a negative example, he frequently solicited criticism, rewarding those officials willing to offer them, particularly Wei and Wang Gui. His openness to opposing ideas was also evident in his attempt to reconcile traditional Taoist religion and Buddhism, as demonstrated in his Emperor's Preface to the Sacred Teachings, and Emperor Taizong was at least a nominal Taoist.

Li Yi's Rebellion
Also in 627, the general Li Yi the Prince of Yan—a late-Sui warlord who later submitted to Tang, who associated with Li Jiancheng—fearing that Emperor Taizong would eventually take action against him, rebelled at Bin Prefecture (in modern Xianyang), but was quickly crushed by the official Yang Ji and killed in flight.  Later that year, when Emperor Gaozu's cousin Li Youliang the Prince of Changle, the commandant at Liang Prefecture (roughly modern Wuwei, Gansu), was accused of allowing his staff to oppress the people and to trade with Qiang and Xiongnu tribesmen, Emperor Taizong sent the chancellor Yuwen Shiji (Yuwen Huaji's brother) to investigate, and in fear, Li Youliang's staff members plotted to hold him hostage and rebel.  When this was discovered, Emperor Taizong forced Li Youliang to commit suicide.  Late in the year, Wang Junkuo, the commandant at You Prefecture (roughly modern Beijing), also rebelled, but was defeated quickly and killed in flight.  However, although there were also reports that Feng Ang, a warlord in the Lingnan region, was rebelling, Emperor Taizong, at Wei's suggestion, sent messengers to comfort Feng, and Feng submitted.

Also in 627, Emperor Taizong, seeing that there were too many prefectures and counties, consolidated and merged many of them, and further created another level of local political organization above prefectures—the circuit – dividing his state into 10 circuits.

Campaign against the Eastern Turks

In 628, with Ashina Duobi and Ashina Shibobi having a falling out, Ashina Shibobi submitted to Emperor Taizong, as did the chieftains of Khitan tribes, who had previously submitted to the Eastern Turks.  With their khaganate in turmoil, Ashina Duobi was no longer able to protect the last late-Sui rebel ruler who alone remained standing against Tang pressure – Liang Shidu the Emperor of Liang, and in summer 628, with the Tang generals Chai Shao and Xue Wanjun sieging the Liang capital Shuofang (in modern Yulin, Shaanxi), Liang Shidu's cousin Liang Luoren killed Liang Shidu and surrendered, finally uniting China.  With the Eastern Turkic Khaganate weakened, their vassal Xueyantuo also broke away and formed its own khanate, and Emperor Taizong entered into an alliance with Xueyantuo's leader Yinan, creating Yinan the Zhenzhupiqie Khan (or Zhenzhu Khan in short).

In late 629, believing the time ripe for a major attack on the Eastern Turks, Emperor Taizong commissioned the general Li Jing with overall command of a multi-pronged army, assisted by the generals Li Shiji, Li Daozong, Chai Shao, Xue Wanche (Xue Wanjun's brother) and Su Dingfang, attacking the Eastern Turks at multiple points.  The army was successful in its attacks, forcing Ashina Duobi to flee, and by late spring 630, Ashina Duobi had been captured, and Eastern-Turkic chieftains all submitted to Tang.  Emperor Taizong spared Ashina Duobi but detained him at Chang'an, and he considered what to do with the Eastern Turks.

The main opposing views were from the chancellors Wen Yanbo (who advocated leaving the Turks within China's borders to serve as a defense perimeter) and Wei (who advocated leaving them outside the borders).  Emperor Taizong accepted Wen's suggestion and established a number of prefectures to accommodate the Turks, leaving them governed by their chieftains without creating a new khan to govern them.

In 631, Emperor Taizong established a feudal scheme, where the contributors to his reign were given, in addition to their current posts, additional posts as prefectural governors, to be passed on to their descendants.  Soon, however, receiving much opposition to the plan, the strongest of which came from Zhangsun Wuji, Emperor Taizong cancelled the scheme.
After the conquest of the Eastern Turkic Khaganate, Emperor Taizong's officials repeatedly requested that he carry out sacrifices to heaven and earth at Mount Tai, and Emperor Taizong, while at times tempted by the proposal, was repeatedly dissuaded from doing so by Wei, who pointed out the expenses and the labors that would be imposed on the people as a result, and also that this would open China's borders to attack.

Middle reign (634–641)

In 634, Emperor Taizong sent 13 high level officials, including Li Jing and Xiao Yu, to examine the circuits to see whether the local officials were capable, to find out whether the people were suffering, to comfort the poor, and to select capable people to serve in civil service.  (Li Jing initially recommended Wei Zheng, but Emperor Taizong declined sending Wei, stating that Wei needed to stay to point out his faults and that he could not afford to have Wei away even for a single day.)

Campaign against Tuyuhun

Around this time, Tang was having increasing conflicts with Tuyuhun, whose Busabo Khan Murong Fuyun, under instigation by his strategist the Prince of Tianzhu, had been repeatedly attacking Tang prefectures on the borders.  At one point, Murong Fuyun sought to have a Tang princess marry his son the Prince of Zun, but the marriage negotiations broke down over Emperor Taizong's insistence that the Prince of Zun come to Chang'an for the wedding.  In summer 634, Emperor Taizong had the generals Duan Zhixuan and Fan Xing lead forces against Tuyuhun, but with Tuyuhun's forces highly mobile and avoiding direct confrontation, Duan, while not defeated, could not make major gains.  Once Duan withdrew, Tuyuhun resumed hostilities.  In winter 634, with the Tibetan king Songtsän Gampo making overtures to marry a Tang princess as well, Emperor Taizong sent the emissary Feng Dexia to Tibet with an eye toward an alliance against Tuyuhun.  In winter 634, he commissioned Li Jing, assisted by the other generals Hou Junji, Xue Wanjun, Xue Wanche, Qibi Heli, Li Daozong, Li Daliang, Li Daoyan, and Gao Zengsheng, to attack Tuyuhun.  In 635, Li Jing's forces crushed Tuyuhun forces.  Murong Fuyun was killed by his own subordinates, and his son Murong Shun killed the Prince of Tianzhu and surrendered.  Emperor Taizong created Murong Shun the new khan, although Murong Shun was soon assassinated.  Emperor Taizong then created Murong Shun's son Murong Nuohebo as the new khan.

Also in 635, Emperor Gaozu died, and Emperor Taizong, observing a mourning period, briefly had Li Chengqian serve as regent, and after he resumed his authorities less than two months later, he still authorized Li Chengqian to thereafter rule on minor matters.

In spring 636, Emperor Taizong commissioned his brothers and sons as commandants and changed their titles in accordance with the commands that they received, sending them to their posts—with the exception of his son Li Tai the Prince of Wei, who by this point was beginning to be highly favored by him.  He further allowed Li Tai to engage literary men to serve as his assistants, as Li Tai favored literature.  From this point on, Li Tai would be so favored that there began to be talks that Emperor Taizong might let him displace Li Chengqian, whose favors began to wane.
In fall 636, Empress Zhangsun died.  Emperor Taizong mourned her bitterly and personally wrote the text of her monument.

In summer 637, Emperor Taizong recreated the feudal scheme that he had considered and abandoned in 631, creating 35 hereditary prefect posts.  (By 639, however, the system was again abandoned after much opposition.)

Treatment of Noble Clan

Sometime before 638, Emperor Taizong, disgusted with the traditional noble clans of Cui, Lu, Li, and Zheng and believing that they were abusing their highly honored names, commissioned Gao Shilian, Wei Ting, Linghu Defen, and Cen Wenben to compile a work later to be known as the Records of Clans, with the intent of dividing the clans into nine classes based on their past contributions, good deeds, and ill deeds.  In an initial draft that Gao submitted, he nevertheless ranked the branch of the Cui clan that the official Cui Min'gan belonged to as the highest, a decision that Emperor Taizong rebuked, as he pointed out that Gao was merely again looking at tradition and not the recent contributions.  He therefore personally intervened in revising the work, reducing Cui's clan to the third class.

Tibetan attack on Songzhou

In fall 638, Tibet's Songtsän Gampo, displeased that Emperor Taizong had declined to give him a Tang princess in marriage and believing that Murong Nuohebo had persuaded Emperor Taizong to decline the marriage proposal, launched a major attack with forces of 200,000 on Tuyuhun and then on several Tang prefectures, putting Song Prefecture (roughly modern Ngawa Tibetan and Qiang Autonomous Prefecture, Sichuan) under siege.  Emperor Taizong commissioned Hou Junji, assisted by Zhishi Sili, Niu Jinda, and Liu Jian, of a total of force of 50,000 to counterattack, and Niu, who commanded the forward forces, defeated Tibetan forces at Song Prefecture.  Songsän Gampo withdrew and sued for peace, but still sought to marry a Tang princess.  Emperor Taizong agreed this time.
Also in 638, believing that Xueyantuo was growing increasingly strong and difficult to control, Emperor Taizong granted Yinan's sons Bazhuo and Jialibi both lesser khan titles, to try to create dissensions between them.
In summer 639, Ashina Jiesheshuai, the younger brother of Ashina Shibobi, whom Emperor Taizong did not favor and gave little recognition to, formed a conspiracy with Ashina Shibobi's son Ashina Hexiangu to assassinate Emperor Taizong.  They had planned to wait for Li Zhi the Prince of Jin to depart from the palace in the morning and use that opportunity to attack the palace.  On the day they planned, however, Li Zhi did not leave the palace, and Ashina Jiesheshuai attacked anyway but was quickly defeated, captured, and executed.  After this incident, however, the officials began advocating sending the Turks away from the heart of the state. In fall 639, Emperor Taizong created a Turkish prince who had served him faithfully, Li Simo (né Ashina Simo) as the khan of a newly recreated Eastern Turkic state (as Qilibi Khan), giving him all of the Turks and Xiongnu who had surrendered as his subordinates, to be settled north of the Great Wall and the Yellow River.  However, the Turks were fearful of Xueyantuo and initially refused to head to their new location.  Emperor Taizong issued an edict to Yinan that he and Li Simo keep their peace and not attack each other, and after receiving from Yinan the assurance that he would not attack, the Turks advanced to the new location.

Campaign against Western Turks

Taizong began a series of campaigns against the Western Turks (Xitujue) and their allies, the oasis states of the Tarim Basin, around 640. These hostilities between the Western Turks and Tang would continue until the defeat and conquest of the Western Turks in 657 under Taizong's successor, Gaozong. The kingdoms of Shule and Khotan surrendered to the Chinese in 632, as did the kingdom of Yarkand in 635. Qu Wentai, the king of Gaochang, who had previously been submissive to Tang, had become increasingly hostile to Tang, allying with the Western Turks.  In 640, Emperor Taizong commissioned Hou Junji, assisted by Xue Wanjun, to launch a major attack on Gaochang.  As they approached Gaochang, Qu Wentai died in fear and was succeeded by his son Qu Zhisheng.  Qu Zhisheng offered to submit, but Hou demanded a surrender, which Qu Zhisheng refused.  However, Hou put Gaochang under siege, and with aid from the Western Turks not arriving, Qu Zhisheng surrendered.  Wei Zheng suggested that Emperor Taizong allow Qu Zhisheng to remain king, pointing out that the monetary and human costs would be high to keep a permanent garrison at Gaochang, but Emperor Taizong disagreed, and he converted Gaochang into two prefectures and annexed it into his state.

In winter 640, Songsän Gampo sent his prime minister Gar Tongtsen Yülsung ("Lu Dongzan" in Chinese) as an emissary to Tang, offering tributes and again requesting marriage.  Emperor Taizong created a daughter of a clansman as the Princess Wencheng, and in 641 sent Li Daozong to accompany Princess Wencheng to Tibet to preside over the wedding.
In winter 641, believing that Emperor Taizong was about to carry out sacrifices to heaven and earth at Mount Tai and would be unable to aid the Eastern Turks, Yinan launched a major attack on them, commanded by his son Dadu.  Li Simo was forced to retreat inside the Great Wall.  Emperor Taizong commissioned Li Shiji, assisted by Zhang Jian, Li Daliang, Zhang Shigui, and Li Xiyu, to attack Xueyantuo.  Li Shiji soon defeated Dadu at Nuozhen River (flowing through modern Baotou, Inner Mongolia), and Dadu fled.

Late reign (642–649)

By 642, it was clear that Li Tai had ambitions on replacing his brother Li Chengqian, and the governmental officials began to be divided into pro-Li Chengqian and pro-Li Tai factions.  After urging by Wei Zheng and Chu Suiliang to take actions that would clarify that Li Chengqian's position was secure, Emperor Taizong attempted to do so by making repeated statements to that effect, but his continued favoring of Li Tai led to continued speculation among officials.

Also by 642, Xueyantuo had posed a sufficiently serious threat (albeit still formally submissive) that Emperor Taizong saw two alternatives—destroying it by force or forming into a heqin relationship by marrying one of his daughters to Yinan.  This particularly became an issue after the Tang general Qibi Heli, the chieftain of the Qibi Tribe, was kidnapped by his own subordinates and taken to Xueyantuo.  In order to ransom Qibi, Emperor Taizong made a promise to eventually give his daughter Princess Xinxing to Yinan in marriage, and Yinan released Qibi.
In the winter 642, an event took place in Goguryeo that would eventually precipitate wars between Tang and Goguryeo.  According to Chinese accounts King Yeongnyu, the king of Goguryeo, was apprehensive about his general Yeon Gaesomun and was plotting with his other officials to kill Yeon.  When Yeon received the news, he started a coup and killed the king and the high level officials.  He declared King Yeongnyu's nephew Go Jang (King Bojang) king, while taking power himself with the title of Dae Mangniji (Generalissimo).  When Emperor Taizong received the news, there were suggestions that an attack be launched against Goguryeo, suggestions that Emperor Taizong initially declined.

In spring 643, Wei died, and Emperor Taizong mourned him bitterly, authoring Wei's monument himself and, prior to Wei's death, promising to give his daughter Princess Hengshan in marriage to Wei's son Wei Shuyu.  Later in spring, Emperor Taizong commissioned 24 portraits at Lingyan Pavilion to commemorate the 24 great contributors to his reign.

Contacts with the Byzantine Empire

The Old Book of Tang and New Book of Tang mention several embassies made by Fu lin (i.e. the Byzantine Empire), which they equated with Daqin (which may refer to the Roman Empire or Middle East), beginning in 643 with an embassy sent by the king Boduoli (i.e. Constans II Pogonatos) to Emperor Taizong, bearing gifts such as red glass and green gemstones. These histories also provided cursory descriptions of Constantinople and its walls, as well as how it was besieged by Da shi (the Arabs of the Umayyad Caliphate) and their commander "Mo-yi" (i.e. Muawiyah I, governor of Syria before becoming caliph), who forced the Byzantines to pay tribute. Henry Yule highlights the fact that Yazdegerd III (r. 632–651), last ruler of the Sasanian Empire, sent diplomats to China for securing aid from Emperor Taizong (considered the suzerain over Ferghana in Central Asia) during the loss of the Persian heartland to the Islamic Rashidun Caliphate, which may have also prompted the Byzantines to send envoys to China amid their recent loss of Syria to the Muslims. Tang Chinese sources also recorded how Sassanid prince Peroz III (636–679) fled to Tang China following the conquest of Persia by the growing Islamic caliphate.

The expansion of China's power into Central Asia under Emperor Taizong seems to have been noticed in the West. Theophylact Simocatta, a Byzantine Greek historian during the reign of Heraclius (r. 610–641), wrote that Taugast (or Taugas; Old Turkic: Tabghach, from Tuoba, the Xianbei clan of Northern Wei), was a great eastern empire in the Far East that ruled over Turkic people, with a capital city roughly 1,500 miles northeast from India that he called Khubdan (from the Turkic word Khumdan, meaning, Chang'an), where idolatry was practiced but the people were wise and lived by just laws. He depicted the Chinese empire as being divided by a great river (i.e. the Yangzi) that served as the boundary between two rival states at war, yet during the reign of Byzantine Emperor Maurice (582–602 AD) the northerners wearing "black coats" conquered the "red coats" of the south (black being a distinctive color worn by the people of Shaanxi, location of the Sui capital Sui Chang'an, according to the 16th-century Persian traveler Hajji Mahomed, or Chaggi Memet). This account may correspond to the conquest of the Chen dynasty and reunification of China by Emperor Wen of Sui (r. 581–604). Simocatta names their ruler as Taisson, which he claimed meant Son of God, either correlating to the Chinese Tianzi (i.e. Son of Heaven) or even the name of the contemporary ruler Emperor Taizong.

Succession dispute
Also in 643, Emperor Taizong would see major turmoil among his own closest family.  In spring 643, his son Li You the Prince of Qi, angry over restrictions that his secretary general Quan Wanji had often placed on him, killed Quan and declared a rebellion.  Emperor Taizong sent Li Shiji against Li You, but before Li Shiji could engage Li You, Li You was captured by his own subordinate Du Xingmin and delivered to Chang'an, where Emperor Taizong ordered him to commit suicide and executed 44 of his associates.

The death of Li You drew out news of another plot.  Li Chengqian, who had been fearful that Emperor Taizong would eventually remove him and replace him with Li Tai, had begun to conspire with Hou Junji, Li Yuanchang the Prince of Han (Emperor Taizong's brother), the general Li Anyan, and his brothers-in-law Zhao Jie and Du He (Du Ruhui's son) to overthrow Emperor Taizong.  During the investigations in the aftermaths of Li You's rebellion, one of the co-conspirators, Li Chengqian's guard Gegan Chengji, was implicated by association, and in order to save himself, he revealed Li Chengqian's plot.  Emperor Taizong was shocked by the news, and he appointed Zhangsun Wuji, Fang Xuanling, Xiao Yu, and Li Shiji, along with the officials in charge of the supreme court and the legislative and examination bureaus of the government to carry out a joint investigation.  At the suggestion of the mid-level official Lai Ji, Emperor Taizong deposed, but did not kill, Li Chengqian, while ordering Li Yuanchang to commit suicide and executing Hou Junji, Li Anyan, Zhao, and Du.

Taizong's eldest son Li Chengqian chose to speak Turkic, dress in Turkic clothes and even set up a tent in his residence in imitation of a Turkic khan. Taizong removed him from the position of heir apparent and chose as his successor Li Zhi, who embraced Han Chinese cultural heritage.

After Li Chengqian was deposed, Emperor Taizong briefly promised Li Tai that he would be made crown prince.  However, as the investigations continued, Emperor Taizong came to the belief that Li Chengqian's downfall was driven by Li Tai's machinations, and therefore resolved to depose Li Tai as well.  At Zhangsun's suggestion, Emperor Taizong created a younger son, Li Zhi the Prince of Jin (who, like Li Chengqian and Li Tai, were born of Empress Zhangsun), crown prince, who was considered kinder and gentler, while exiling Li Chengqian and Li Tai.  However, starting later that year, Emperor Taizong began to doubt whether Li Zhi's personality was sufficiently strong to serve as emperor, and he toyed with the idea of making another son, Li Ke the Prince of Wu, a son of his concubine Consort Yang (Emperor Yang of Sui's daughter), crown prince, but did not do so due to strong opposition by Zhangsun Wuji.

Meanwhile, coming to the belief that he made an ill-advised promise to Yinan to give him Princess Xinxing in marriage, Emperor Taizong demanded a large amount of bride price – 50,000 horses, 10,000 cows and camels, and 100,000 sheep—a price that Yinan agreed to, but could not immediately collect and deliver.  Emperor Taizong used it as an excuse to cancel the marriage agreement.  Meanwhile, as Wei Zheng had, prior to his death, recommended Hou Junji and Li Chengqian's staff member Du Zhenglun as chancellors, Emperor Taizong came to suspect that Wei was part of the plot as well.  He destroyed the monument he had authored for Wei and cancelled the betrothal between Wei Shuyu and Princess Hengshan.

Campaign against the Karasahr

In 644, with Yanqi's king Long Tuqizhi, who had assisted the Tang campaign to conquer Gaochang, turning against Tang and allying with the Western Turks, Emperor Taizong sent the general Guo Xiaoke, the commandant at Anxi (i.e., Gaochang) to launch a surprise attack on Yanqi.  Guo caught Long Tuqizhi by surprise and captured him, making his brother Long Lipozhun regent.  (The Western Turkic viceroy Ashina Quli subsequently captured Long Lipozhun and briefly occupied Yanqi, although he then, not wanting a direct confrontation with Tang, withdrew, and the Yanqi nobles made Long Tuqizhi's cousin Long Xuepoanazhi king.)

Goguryeo-Tang War

Also in 644, with Goguryeo attacking Silla and Silla requesting aid, Emperor Taizong decided to prepare for a campaign to conquer Goguryeo.  He arrested the emissaries that Yeon sent to the Tang court, accusing them of disloyalty to King Yeongnyu.  By winter 644, the mobilization was in full force.  (Apparently because of Tang's preparation to attack Goguryeo, however, the reconstituted Eastern Turkic people, fearing an attack from Xueyantuo at a time that Tang would be ill-equipped to assist, panicked and abandoned their khan Li Simo, fleeing into Tang territory.  Emperor Taizong reabsorbed the Eastern Turks into Tang, while making Li Simo a general in his army.)

In spring 645, Emperor Taizong departed from Luoyang and led the troops northeast, behind a vanguard of 60,000 commanded by Li Shiji and Li Daozong. At the same time, Zhang Liang led the other 40,000 from sea. By summer 645, Tang forces had captured Yodong Fortress (in modern Liaoyang, Liaoning), and headed southeast toward the Goguryeo capital Pyongyang.  Emperor Taizong personally led about 30,000 Tang and tribal forces and defeated a 150,000 force commanded by two Gogureyo generals and then put Ansi (in modern Anshan, Liaoning) fortress under siege.

However, the capable defense put up by Ansi's commanding general stymied Tang forces and, in late fall, after suffering some casualties, with winter fast approaching and his food supplies running out, Emperor Taizong withdrew.  He much regretted launching the campaign and made the comment, "If Wei Zheng were still alive, he would never have let me launch this campaign."  He reerected the monument he authored for Wei and summoned Wei's wife and children to meet him, treating them well.

Campaign against Xueyantuo and conquest of the Kucha

Meanwhile, in the aftermaths of the Goguryeo campaign, Xueyantuo's Duomi Khan Bazhuo (son of Yinan, who had died earlier in 645) launched attacks against Tang's border prefectures, with largely inconclusive results.  In spring 646, the Tang generals Qiao Shiwang and Zhishi Sili counterattacked, defeating Bazhuo's forces, causing him to flee.  His vassals Huige, Pugu, and Tongluo tribes took the opportunity to rebel and attack him.  Hearing this, Emperor Taizong launched a major attack, commanded by Li Daozong, Ashina She'er, Zhishi Sili, Qibi Heli, Xue Wanche, and Zhang Jian, against Xueyantuo.  With Xueyantuo under attack from multiple sides, Bazhuo was killed by Huige forces, and the remaining Xueyantuo people fled and supported Bazhuo's cousin Duomozhi as Yitewushi Khan, but soon offered to submit to Tang.  Emperor Taizong sent Li Shiji toward Duomozhi's location, with the direction to either accept his submission or destroy him.  Duomozhi surrendered and was taken to Chang'an, ending Xueyantuo's rule over the region.  The other tribes formerly submissive to Xueyantuo offered Emperor Taizong the title of "Heavenly Khan" and thereafter largely became submissive to Tang. Tang nominally established seven command posts and six prefectures over the region.  (Huige's khan Yaoluoge Tumidu, while submissive to Tang, for some time tried to take control over the region himself, but was subsequently assassinated in 648, and there would be no other organized attempt by Huige to take over the region until for about another century.)

After the victory over Xueyantuo, Emperor Taizong again turned his attention toward to Goguryeo, cutting off relations once more and considering another campaign.  Under suggestions by some of his officials, he decided to launch harassment campaigns against Goguryeo's northern region on a yearly basis, to weaken Goguryeo gradually.  The first of these campaigns was launched in spring 647, with Li Shiji and Niu Jinda in command, and would reoccur. All this was in preparation of another campaign in 649 with forces totaling 300,000, but Taizong died before this campaign and the campaign was stalled into Gaozong's reign.

In 648, Emperor Taizong launched another campaign, commanded by Ashina She'er, aimed at Qiuzi, but first attacking Yanqi and killing Long Xuepoanazhi and replacing him with his cousin Long Xiannazhun.  Ashina She'er advanced on Qiuzi and captured its king Bai Helibushibi, making his brother king instead.

Death
By summer of 649, Emperor Taizong was seriously ill—with some believing that his illness was caused by the medicine he was administered by Buddhists or his taking of pills given to him by alchemists. Believing Li Shiji to be capable but fearing that he would not be submissive to Li Zhi, he demoted Li Shiji out of the capital to be the commandant at remote Die Prefecture (roughly modern Gannan Tibetan Autonomous Prefecture, Gansu), with instructions to Li Zhi that if Li Shiji hesitated, to execute him immediately, and if he did not, to recall him after Emperor Taizong's death and make him chancellor.  Li Shiji, when receiving the order and realizing that his life was at stake, immediately departed for Die Prefecture.  (After Emperor Taizong's death, Li Zhi would indeed recall Li Shiji and make him chancellor.) Soon thereafter, Emperor Taizong, after entrusting Li Zhi to Zhangsun Wuji and Chu Suiliang, died at his summer palace Cuiwei Palace.  His death was initially kept a secret, and three days later, after his casket had been returned to Chang'an, his death was announced, and Li Zhi took the throne as Emperor Gaozong.

Monuments
After consolidating the Tang Empire, Emperor Taizong ordered six large stone panels, known as Zhaoling Liujun, to be carved with the portraits of his favorite horses. These were the horses he had ridden in overcoming his rivals and securing the borders of the country. 

Emperor Taizong further composed laudatory poems for each of the six horses depicted in the stone reliefs. Constructed between 636 and 649 CE, the stone reliefs "exemplify the beauty of early Tang sculpture; the images are realistic yet powerful, created with simplicity and matured craftsmanship."

After Taizong's death, the monuments were situated along the east and west sides of the "spirit path" at the North Gate of the tomb complex named Zhaoling or Zhao Mausoleum. The six stone horse reliefs remained at the Mausoleum until the early twentieth century, when four were removed to the Beilin Museum in Xi'an, China and two were sold and subsequently donated to the Penn Museum in Philadelphia in 1921.

Era name
 Zhenguan 627–649

Chancellors during reign

Family
Consorts and Issue:
 Empress Wende, of the Zhangsun clan of Henan (601–636)
 Li Chengqian, Prince Min of Hengshan (618–645), first son
 Li Tai, Prince Gong of Pu (620–653), fourth son
 Princess Changle (621–643), personal name Lizhi, fifth daughter
 Married Zhangsun Chong of Henan, a son of Zhangsun Wuji, in 633, and had issue (one son)
 Li Zhi, Gaozong (628–683), ninth son
 Princess Chengyang (630–671), personal name Yuemao (月貌), sixteenth daughter
 Married Du He of Jingzhao, Duke Xiangyang (616–643), a son of Du Ruhui
 Married Xue Guan of Hedong in 643, and had issue (two sons)
 Princess Jinyang (633–644), personal name Mingda (明达)
 Princess Xincheng (634–663), personal name Zi (字), twenty-first daughter
 Married Zhangsun Quan of Henan (636–659) in 649
 Married Wei Zhengju of Jingzhao (d. 663) in 660
 Noble Consort, of the Wei clan of Jingzhao (597–665), personal name Gui
 Princess Linchuan (624–682), personal name Mengjiang (孟姜), tenth daughter
 Married Zhou Daowu of Runan, Duke Qiao, and had issue (three sons, two daughters)
 Li Shen, Prince of Ji (629–689), tenth son
 Noble Consort, of the Yang clan
 Li Fu, Prince of Zhao (634–670), 13th son
 Consort, of the Yang clan
 Li Ke, Prince of Wu (619–653), third son
 Li Yin, Prince Dao of Shu (621–667), sixth son
 Consort, of the Yin clan
 Li You, Prince of Qi (621–643), fifth son
 Virtuous Consort, of the Yan clan (609–671)
 Li Zhen, Prince Jing of Yue (627–688), eighth son
 Li Xiao, Prince Shang of Jiang (630–632), 11th son
Able Consort, of the Zheng clan (賢妃 郑氏)
 Able Consort, of the Xu clan (627–650), personal name Hui
Lady of Bright Countenance, of the Wei clan (昭容 韋氏), personal name Nizi  (尼子)
Imperial Concubine, of a certain clan (下嫔某氏)
Princess Yuzhang (豫章公主; 621–642), sixth daughter
Married Tang Yishi (唐義識), a son of Tang Jian, in 637, and had issue (one son)
Beauty, of the Xiao clan (美人 萧氏)
 Talented Lady, of the Wu clan; 624–705, personal name Mei (媚), known commonly as Empress Wu Zetian 
Talented Lady, of the Cui clan of Qinghe (才人 清河崔氏)
Talented Lady, of the Xiao clan (才人 萧氏) 
 Princess consort, of the Yang clan of Hongnong
 Li Ming, Prince Gong of Cao (d. 682), 14th son
 Lady, of the Wang clan
 Li Yun, Prince of Jiang (d. 674), seventh son
Lady, of the Gao clan (高氏)
 Unknown
 Li Kuan, Prince Chu (b. 619), second son
 Li Jian, Prince Dai (631), 12th son
 Princess Xiangcheng (d. 651), first daughter
 Married Xiao Rui of Lanling, Duke Song, a son of Xiao Yu
 Princess Runan (d. 636), third daughter
 Princess Nanping (d. 650), third daughter
 Married Wang Jingzhi, Baron Nancheng, the youngest son of Wang Gui, in 637
 Married Liu Xuanyi of Henan, Duke Yu in 643
 Princess Sui'an (d. 651), fourth daughter
 Married Dou Kui of Henan, Baron Xindou
 Married Wang Dali (613–669), and had issue (one son)
 Princess Baling (d. 653), seventh daughter
 Married Chai Lingwu, Duke Xiangyang (d. 653), the second son of Chai Shao
 Princess Pu'an, eighth daughter
 Married Shi Renbiao, Duke Dou
 Princess Dongyang (d. 701), ninth daughter
 Married Gao Lüxing of Bohai, Duke Shen, the first son of Gao Shilian
 Princess Qinghe (624–664), personal name Jing, 11th daughter
 Married Cheng Huailiang, Duke Dong'a, the second son of Cheng Zhijie, in 633
 Princess Lanling (628–659), personal name Shu, 19th daughter
 Married Dou Huaizhe of Henan in 636, and had issue (one daughter)
 Princess Jin'an, 13th daughter
 Married Wei Si'an of Jingzhao
 Married Yang Renlu of Hongnong
 Princess Ankang, 14th daughter
 Married Dugu Mou of Henan in 643
 Princess Xinxing, 15th daughter
 Married Zhangsun Xi of Henan
 Princess Gaoyang (d. 653)
 Married Fang Yi'ai of Qinghe (d. 653), a son of Fang Xuanling, in 648 
 Princess Jinshan, 18th daughter
 Princess Changshan, 20th daughter

Ancestry

Literary and other cultural references
Emperor Taizong was the subject of a 64-chapter (in eight volumes) The Novel of the Prince of Qin of the Great Tang (大唐秦王詞話 Datang Qin Wang Cihua) by Zhu Shenglin of the Ming Dynasty. The novel is also known as The Biography of the Prince of Qin of the Tang Dynasty, Romance of Tang, and  Romance of the Prince of Qin.
Journey to the West details a fictional account of the origin of the Chinese door gods. Emperor Taizong asked his generals Qin Shubao and Yuchi Gong to stand guard outside his bedroom to protect him from a vengeful spirit.

Television/Cinema
 Hong Kong's TVB produced a television series about Li Shimin's adventure based on The Novel of the Prince of Qin of the Great Tang.
 The Foundation, a 1983 Hong Kong television series produced by TVB. It featured a young Li Shimin prominently as one of its three leading characters.
 Portrayed by Sean Lau in the 1987 TVB TV series The Grand Canal.
 Portrayed by Wilson Lam in 1993 Taiwan's TTV 54 episodes TV series Tang Taizong, Li Shimin.
 Portrayed by Peter Ho in the 2004 TV series The Prince of Qin, Li Shimin.
 Portrayed by Shen Xiaohai in the 2006 TV series Initiating Prosperity.
 Portrayed by Tang Guoqiang in the CCTV-1 TV series Carol of Zhenguan.
 Portrayed by Ma Yue in the 2006 BTV TV series The Rise of the Tang Empire.
 Portrayed by Seo In-seok and Lee Joo-hyeon in 2006–2007 SBS TV series Yeon Gaesomun.
 Portrayed by Song Yong-tae in the 2006–2007 KBS TV series Dae Jo Yeong.
Portrayed by Yu Shaoqun in the 2012 Hunan TV TV series Heroes of Sui and Tang Dynasties.
 Portrayed by Yoon Seung-won in the 2012–2013 KBS1 TV series Dream of the Emperor.
Portrayed by Du Chun in the 2013 Dragon TV TV series Heroes in Sui and Tang Dynasties.
 Portrayed by Zhang Fengyi in the 2014 Hunan Television TV series The Empress of China.
Portrayed by Zheng Guo Lin in the 2014 TV series Heroes of Sui and Tang Dynasties 3 & 4.
Portrayed by Winston Chao in the 2016 movie Xuanzang.
Portrayed by Park Sung-woong in the 2018 Korean film The Great Battle.
Portrayed by Geng Le in the 2021 Chinese TV series The Long Ballad 長歌行.
Portrayed by Qin Junjie in the upcoming CCTV TV series Peace in Palace, Peace in Chang'An.
Portrayed by Ma Yue in the TV series Ode to Daughter of Great Tang.
Portrayed in the 2021 WEBNOVEL titled QUEEN JINDEOK by author TAIYANG DASHENG

See also 

 Chinese emperors family tree (middle)
 Turks in the Tang military

References

Bibliography
  
 .

 

 (alk. paper)

  (paperback).
 

 
 .

 

 

 
 

 
  
 .

Further reading
 Old Book of Tang, vols. 2, 3.
 New Book of Tang, vol. 2.
 Zizhi Tongjian, vols. 182, 183, 184, 185, 186, 187, 188, 189, 190, 191, 192, 193, 194, 195, 196, 197, 198, 199.
 
 Luttwak, Edward N. (2009). The Grand Strategy of the Byzantine Empire. Cambridge and London: The Belknap Press of Harvard University Press. .
 Schafer, Edward H. (1985) [1963], The Golden Peaches of Samarkand: A study of T'ang Exotics (1st paperback ed.), Berkeley and Los Angeles: University of California Press, .
  See especially : Ch.4, T'ai-tsung (626–49) the Consolidator. p. 150 to 241.
 Yule, Henry (1915). Henri Cordier (ed.), Cathay and the Way Thither: Being a Collection of Medieval Notices of China, Vol I: Preliminary Essay on the Intercourse Between China and the Western Nations Previous to the Discovery of the Cape Route. London: Hakluyt Society. Accessed 21 September 2016.

External links

 The biographies of the sons (in Traditional Chinese)
 唐太宗百字箴与百字铭

|- style="text-align: center;"

|-

|-

|-

598 births
649 deaths
Tang dynasty emperors
Tang dynasty generals at war against Goguryeo
Chancellors under Emperor Gaozu of Tang
Tang dynasty poets
Tang dynasty generals at war against the Göktürks
7th-century Chinese monarchs
Politicians from Xianyang
Poets from Shaanxi
Tang dynasty politicians from Shaanxi
Writers from Xianyang
Chinese duellists
Fratricides